Stratford Shakespeare festival may refer to:

 Stratford Shakespeare Festival, Stratford, Ontario, Canada
 American Shakespeare Theatre, Stratford, Connecticut, United States
 Complete Works (RSC festival), Stratford-upon-Avon, Warwickshire, England
 Shakespeare on the River Festival, Stratford, Victoria, Australia